The Front, is a 1943 Soviet drama film directed by Vasilyev brothers.

Plot 
The film tells about the necessary change of generations in the leadership of the Red Army as a result of the beginning of the Great Patriotic War.

Starring 
 Boris Zhukovsky as Ivan Gorlov
 Boris Babochkin as Ognev
 Pavel Geraga as Kolos
 Boris Dmokhovsky as Blagonravov
 Vasili Vanin as Khripun
 Boris Chirkov as Udivitelnyy
 Lev Sverdlin as Gaidar
 Pavel Volkov as Miron Gorlov
 Nikolay Kryuchkov as Sergei Gorlov
 Boris Blinov as Ostapenko
 Zh. Oguzbaev as Shayakhmetov
 N. Kostov as Gomelauri
 A. Chepurnov as Bashlykov
 Anna Petukhova as Marusya (as A. Petukhova)
 Andrei Apsolon	
 Vladimir Gremin
 Aleksandr Ilyinsky	
 Yuriy Korshun
 Pyotr Sobolevsky

References

External links 
 

1943 films
1940s Russian-language films
Soviet war drama films
1940s war drama films
Soviet black-and-white films
1943 drama films